Pope Mina II of Alexandria was the 61st Pope of Alexandria and Patriarch of the See of St. Mark.

10th-century Coptic Orthodox popes of Alexandria
Copts from the Fatimid Caliphate